Razmabad (also Romanized as Razmābād) is a village in Shonbeh Rural District, Shonbeh and Tasuj District, Dashti County, Bushehr Province, Iran. At the 2006 census, its population was 29, in 6 families.

References 

Populated places in Dashti County